Jennifer A. Hemingway is an American federal law enforcement officer and former political advisor who briefly served as the acting Sergeant at Arms of the United States Senate and acting chairwoman of the Capitol Police Board. After being passed over for the position, Hemingway became chief of staff to the Senate's Sergeant at Arms.

Education 
Hemingway earned a Bachelor of Arts in political science and Bachelor of Science in economics from the University of Florida, followed by a Master of Public Administration in budget and public finance from George Washington University.

Career 
In 1999, Hemingway became the deputy staff director of the United States House Committee on Oversight and Reform. In 2001 and 2002, she was the associate director of public affairs at the United States Department of Transportation. She was the director of legislative and regulatory affairs at the Blue Cross Blue Shield Association before becoming a staffer of the United States Senate Committee on Homeland Security and Governmental Affairs. After eight years with the Homeland Security Committee, Hemingway worked as the treasurer of the District of Columbia Library Association and president of the Junior League of Washington. She returned to the United States House Committee on Oversight and Reform in 2015. In 2017 and 2018, she was the director of operations for then-Speaker Paul Ryan. Hemingway was selected to serve as deputy Sergeant at Arms of the United States Senate in December 2018.

Sergeant at Arms of the United States Senate

On January 7, 2021, Hemingway was named by Senate Majority leader Mitch McConnell as acting Senate Sergeant at Arms, following the resignation of Michael C. Stenger after the 2021 storming of the United States Capitol. House sergeant-at-arms Paul D. Irving and United States Capitol Police chief Steven Sund also resigned the same day, amid bipartisan shock and outrage over security lapses that led to the mob's breach and occupation of the Capitol. She held the post until General Karen Gibson was confirmed as the new Senate Sergeant at Arms.

References 

Living people
University of Florida alumni
Trachtenberg School of Public Policy & Public Administration alumni
Sergeants at Arms of the United States Senate
Women in law enforcement
United States Department of Transportation officials
Year of birth missing (living people)